Aldemir may be both a given name and surname. Notable people with the name include:

 Aldemir Bendine (born 1963), Brazilian chief executive officer (CEO) of Petrobras
 Aldemir da Silva Junior (born 1992), Brazilian sprinter
 Aldemir Martins (1922–2006), Brazilian artist
 Furkan Aldemir (born 1991), Turkish basketball player

Portuguese masculine given names
Turkish-language surnames